The 1967 Scottish Cup Final was played on 29 April 1967 at Hampden Park in Glasgow and was the final match of the 82nd Scottish Cup. The match was contested by Celtic and Aberdeen, and the match was won 2–0 by Celtic with goals from Willie Wallace.

Match details

See also 

 1966–67 in Scottish football

References

External links
 Video highlights from official Pathé News archive

1967
Final
Scottish Cup Final 1967
Scottish Cup Final 1967
1960s in Glasgow
April 1967 sports events in the United Kingdom